Tretter is a German and Austrian surname. Notable people with the surname include:
 Christiane Tretter (born 1964), German mathematician
 Felix Tretter (born 1949), Austrian psychiatrist, psychologist and cyberneticisn
 Hannes Tretter (born 1951), Austrian lawyer and human rights expert
 Jean-Nickolaus Tretter (1846-2022), an American Minnesota-born archivist, founder of the Jean-Nickolaus Tretter Collection in Gay, Lesbian, Bisexual and Transgender Studies
 J. C. Tretter (born 1991), American football player

German-language surnames